Robert Wallace Urie (22 October 1854 – 6 January 1937) was a Scottish locomotive engineer who was the last chief mechanical engineer of the London and South Western Railway.

Career
After serving an apprenticeship with and working for various private locomotive manufacturers he joined the Caledonian Railway in 1890, and became chief draughtsman, and later Works Manager at St. Rollox railway works under Dugald Drummond. In 1897 he moved with Drummond to join the London and South Western Railway (LSWR) as works manager at Nine Elms in London. He transferred to the new works at Eastleigh in 1909.
Following the death of Dugald Drummond in 1912, Urie became chief mechanical engineer until his own retirement at the grouping of 1923.

Locomotive designs

Robert Urie made a significant contribution to the development of more powerful express passenger and goods locomotives for use on the London and South Western Railway main line, with simple yet robust designs. In particular his LSWR H15 class, LSWR N15 class and LSWR S15 class 4-6-0 as well LSWR Class G16 4-8-0T and LSWR H16 class 4-6-2T locomotives continued to be built by the Southern Railway under Richard Maunsell's direction.

Patents
 GB191410781, published 13 August 1914, Improvements in means for connecting pipes or conduits    
 GB191410782, published 3 September 1914, Improvements in steam superheaters

Family
His son David Chalmers Urie  was a locomotive engineer with the Highland Railway and later the London, Midland and Scottish Railway.

References 

 (incorporating ) p. 18

Further reading 
 John Marshall, (1978) A biographical dictionary of locomotive engineers, David & Charles

|-

1854 births
1937 deaths
Locomotive builders and designers
London and South Western Railway people
Scottish railway mechanical engineers
Scottish mechanical engineers